Nicole Henry is an American jazz singer. Her debut CD, The Nearness of You received critical acclaim and earned Henry the "Best New Jazz Artist" award by HMV Japan. Henry's Teach Me Tonight reached #1 in Japan and was named HMV Japan's Best Vocal Jazz Album of 2005. She won the 2013 Soul Train Music Award for "Best Traditional Jazz Performance".

Personal life
Nicole Henry was born in Philadelphia, Pennsylvania. Her father, Al Henry, moved his family when he played basketball for the Philadelphia 76ers and she grew up in the small community of Andalusia, Bensalem Township, Bucks County.

Career 
In 2000, Henry toured as a background singer for Robert Bradley's Blackwater Surprise, performing blues/rock music. IN the late 1990s, she also lent her voice to two dance music recordings written by Noel W. Sanger, one song "Miracle," reached #8 on the Billboard Dance Music Chart in 1998. She discovered jazz while singing in Miami Beach when her then bassist, Paul Shewchuk, invited her to learn some jazz standards to perform with his trio. The Miami New Times named Henry “Best Solo Musician 2002”.

In 2004, Henry released her debut CD, The Nearness of You, on Banister Records. The album earned Henry the "Best New Jazz Artist" award by HMV Japan.

The following year, Henry's Teach Me Tonight reached #1 in Japan and was named HMV Japan's Best Vocal Jazz Album of 2005.

Her 2008 album The Very Thought of You reached #7 on Billboard's jazz chart. On this third studio album, she worked with contemporary songwriters like K. J. Denhert (I Found You), and James Bryan McCollum, with whom she co-wrote "All That I Can See."

Her 2011 release Embraceable reached Top 20 on U.S. Jazz and Smooth Jazz Radio Charts and featured Kirk Whalum, Gerald Clayton, John Stoddart, Julian Lage, Gil Goldstein, Larry Gernadier and Eric Harland among others.

In 2012, she made her San Francisco debut at The Razz Room.

In 2013, she sang new renditions of hits from the 1970s on her album So Good, So Right: Nicole Henry Live recorded in front of crowds at Feinstein's in New York City.

In 2013, Henry received the "Soul Train Award" for "Best Traditional Jazz Performance" after competing with George Benson, Jeffrey Osborne, Chaka Khan, Tony Bennett, Marc Anthony and Terrence Blanchard.

In a 2014 interview with CBS Miami, she cited Dinah Washington and Sarah Vaughan as sources of inspiration.

In 2015, Henry released her seventh CD, entitled Summer Sessions, an eight-song acoustic EP with both covers and originals, accompanied by James Bryan.

Henry was invited to sing the National Anthem at the Orange Bowl in both 2010 and 2018.

In 2019, she returned to the theatrical stage and garnered critical praise for her portrayal of Nikki Marron in “The Bodyguard," a new musical based on the smash hit 1992 film.  In late 2020, she will perform in the new musical “A Wonderful World,” the story of Louis Armstrong, debuting at the Colony Theatre in Miami Beach, FL.

Henry is currently in the studio working on her eighth album which is slated to be released in late 2020.

Discography 
 The Nearness of You (Banister, 2004)
 Teach Me Tonight (Venus, 2005)
 The Very Thought of You (Banister, 2008)
 Embraceable (ArtistShare, 2011)
 Set for the Season (Banister 2011)
 So Good, So Right (Banister, 2013)
 Nicole Henry & James Bryan - Summer Sessions (Banister, 2015)
 “Time to Love Again” (Banister, 2021)

References

External links 
 

Living people
Torch singers
American women jazz singers
American jazz singers
Smooth jazz singers
Year of birth missing (living people)
21st-century American women
Venus Records artists
ArtistShare artists